Susane Giti SUP, fcps is a retired major general of Bangladesh Army. She is the first to be promoted to 2 star General. She served as the Commandant of Armed Forces Institute of Pathology. She was promoted to the rank of major general on 30 September 2018 as the first female major general in the Bangladesh Army.

Education 
Giti obtained an MBBS degree from Rajshahi Medical College in 1985 and taught Rubia Khanam during 1995. She received her FCPS degree in haematology in 1996.

Career 
Giti joined the medical wing of the Bangladesh armed forces as a captain in 1986. She worked as a pathology specialist in UN Mission and different military hospitals. She was the head of Pathology Department of Armed Forces Medical College. General Giti retired from the army on February, 2023.

Personal life 
Giti is married to Brigadier General (retd) Md Hossain Saad who was a physician in the army medical corps.

See also
Women in the Bangladesh Army

References 

Living people
Bangladesh Army generals
Year of birth missing (living people)
Rajshahi College alumni
Female army generals